Bloomsbury and Nechells railway station served the district of Nechells, Birmingham, England, from 1856 to 1869 by the Grand Junction Railway.

History 
The station was opened on 1 August 1856 by the London and North Western Railway. It was also known as Bloomsbury and Nechels in Bradshaw and Bloomsbury in the LNWR timetable. It closed on 1 March 1869 when Duddeston was rebuilt.

References 

Former London and North Western Railway stations
Railway stations in Great Britain opened in 1856
Railway stations in Great Britain closed in 1869
1856 establishments in England
1869 disestablishments in England